Phan Thanh Hùng (born 1960) is a Vietnamese retired footballer who played as a striker. He is now the manager for SHB Danang.

Hùng was also the head coach of Vietnam in 2012.

Statistics

International

Caps and goals by year

Caps and goals by year

References 

1960 births
Living people
People from Da Nang
Vietnamese footballers
Association football forwards
Vietnam international footballers
Vietnamese football managers
Vietnam national football team managers